This article shows all participating team squads at the 2003 Women's NORCECA Volleyball Championship, held from September 13 to September 18, 2003, in Santo Domingo, Dominican Republic.

Head Coach: Lorne Sawula

Head Coach: Luis Felipe Calderon

Head Coach: Toshi Yoshida

References

USA Volleyball (Archived 2009-05-14)
Canada Volleyball (Archived 2009-05-14)

C
N